Qa (Ԛ ԛ; italics: Ԛ ԛ) is a letter of the Cyrillic script. Its form is based on the Latin letter Q (Q q). Depending on the font, the uppercase form can look like a reversed Cyrillic letter Р.

Qa is used in the alphabet of the Kurdish language and in the old alphabet of the Abkhaz language. In both it represents the voiceless uvular plosive . It was also used in the old alphabet of the Ossetian language.

This character appeared in newspapers and articles such as 1955's Кӧрдо.

The letter was also used in the scrapped version of the Azerbaijani alphabet, it was however eliminated and replaced by Ҝ in Dagestan.

Computing codes

See also
Other Cyrillic letters used to write the sound :
Қ қ : Cyrillic letter Ka with descender
Ӄ ӄ : Cyrillic letter Ka with hook
Ҡ ҡ : Cyrillic letter Bashkir Qa
Ԟ ԟ : Cyrillic letter Aleut Ka
Cyrillic characters in Unicode

References

External links

Cyrillic letters